Tatyana Nikolaevna Devyatova (born 19 September 1948) is a Ukrainian former swimmer. She competed at the 1964 and 1968 Summer Olympics in individual butterfly and 4 × 100 m medley events. She finished in third and fourth place, respectively, in the relay, whereas individually she failed to reach the finals. She won a silver medal in the 4 × 100 m medley relay at the 1966 European Aquatics Championships and finished fourth in the 100 m butterfly.

After marriage she changed her last name to Kostitsyna.

References

1948 births
Living people
People from Kupiansk
Ukrainian female butterfly swimmers
Olympic swimmers of the Soviet Union
Swimmers at the 1964 Summer Olympics
Swimmers at the 1968 Summer Olympics
Olympic bronze medalists for the Soviet Union
Olympic bronze medalists in swimming
European Aquatics Championships medalists in swimming
National University of Kharkiv alumni
Medalists at the 1964 Summer Olympics
Soviet female butterfly swimmers
Sportspeople from Kharkiv Oblast